Vitelmo of Turin or William of Turin (also Guglielmo) (died 1092) was an Italian bishop. He was bishop of Turin from  until his death in 1092.

Biography
Vitelmo may have been the son of Vitelmo-Bruno of the Baratonia, a powerful viscount in Turin.
Vitelmo was appointed bishop of Turin by Henry IV. According to the contemporary chronicler, William of Chiusa, Vitelmo paid a large sum of money in return for his office.

Like many of his predecessors, Vitelmo made donations to the monastery of Santa Maria in Cavour, which had been founded by Bishop Landulf of Turin.

Vitelmo also continued the conflict with Abbot Benedict II (r.c.1066-1091) of the monastery of San Michele della Chiusa, which had begun under Bishop Cunibert of Turin.

References
 William of Chiusa, Vita Benedicti abbatis Clusensis, ed. L. Bethmann, MGH SS 12 (Hannover, 1856).
F. Savio, Gli antichi vescovi d’Italia. Il Piemonte (Turin, 1899), pp. 335–339. 
 A. Tarpino, ‘Tradizione pubblica e radicamento signorile nello sviluppo signorile dei Visconti di Baratonia (secoli XI-XIII),’ Bollettino storico-bibliografico subalpino 79 (1981), 5-65. 
 C.W. Previté-Orton, The Early History of the House of Savoy (1000-1233) (Cambridge, 1912).

Notes

11th-century Italian Roman Catholic bishops
Bishops of Turin
1092 deaths

it:Guglielmo III (vescovo di Torino)